The C date and time functions are a group of functions in the standard library of the C programming language implementing date and time manipulation operations. They provide support for time acquisition, conversion between date formats, and formatted output to strings.

Overview of functions

The C date and time operations are defined in the time.h header file (ctime header in C++).

The  and related types were originally proposed by Markus Kuhn to provide a variety of time bases, but only  was accepted. The functionalities were, however, added to C++ in 2020 in std::chrono.

Example

The following C source code prints the current time to the standard output stream.
#include <time.h>
#include <stdlib.h>
#include <stdio.h>

int main(void)
{
    time_t current_time;
    char* c_time_string;

    /* Obtain current time. */
    current_time = time(NULL);

    if (current_time == ((time_t)-1))
    {
        (void) fprintf(stderr, "Failure to obtain the current time.\n");
        exit(EXIT_FAILURE);
    }

    /* Convert to local time format. */
    c_time_string = ctime(&current_time);

    if (c_time_string == NULL)
    {
        (void) fprintf(stderr, "Failure to convert the current time.\n");
        exit(EXIT_FAILURE);
    }

    /* Print to stdout. ctime() has already added a terminating newline character. */
    (void) printf("Current time is %s", c_time_string);
    exit(EXIT_SUCCESS);
}

The output is:
Current time is Thu Sep 15 21:18:23 2016

See also
 Unix time
 Year 2038 problem

References

External links

C standard library
Time